Ischnodoris chlorosperma is a moth in the family Autostichidae. It was described by Edward Meyrick in 1929. It is found in Sri Lanka.

The wingspan is about 17 mm. The forewings are fuscous mixed darker with a pale ochreous median basal dot. The stigmata form small suffused darker spots, the plical slightly before the first discal. The hindwings are pale grey.

References

Moths described in 1929
Autostichinae